Ellisella paraplexauroides is a vulnerable gorgonian considered among the largest colonial invertebrates of the Mediterranean Sea.

It has an unusual restricted and uneven distribution, with isolated and extremely sparse
colonies in a few sites in the Alboran Sea, the coasts of Algeria and Tunisia,
and in the Strait of Sicily, with an exceptionally dense and rich
population around the Natura 2000 site on Chafarinas Islands, where its colonies
make a unique seascape.

References

Ellisellidae
Anthozoa of North Africa
Vulnerable biota of Europe
Taxobox binomials not recognized by IUCN